Michael Bonacini (born March 1, 1960) is a Welsh-Canadian chef who owns eleven restaurants (including Jump, Canoe, Luma, and Bannock) in Toronto, Ontario and is a co-founder of Oliver & Bonacini Restaurants. Bonacini trained in London and immigrated to Canada in 1985. He founded his first restaurant, Jump, with business partner Peter Oliver in 1993.

Bonacini is a judge on the television cooking competition MasterChef Canada and the host of Bonacini's Italy, a cooking program featuring cuisines from different regions of Italy cooked by Bonacini. He was also featured on Cook Like A Chef and is the Resident Chef for The Marilyn Denis Show.

References

1960 births
Living people
Canadian television chefs
Participants in Canadian reality television series
Welsh people of Italian descent
Welsh emigrants to Canada
Canadian people of Italian descent
Canadian male chefs